Sahr James (born 17 October 1987) is a swimmer from Sierra Leone, and swam the 50 m backstroke and 50m breaststroke at the 2013 World Championships. He is the national record holder for both events, with times of 37.36 and 37.26, which are many seconds off the world record and relatively slow.

References

1987 births
Living people
Male backstroke swimmers
Male breaststroke swimmers
Sierra Leonean male swimmers